Euzopherodes pusilla is a species of snout moth in the genus Euzopherodes. It was described by Paul Mabille in 1906. It is found in Algeria.

References

Moths described in 1906
Phycitini
Endemic fauna of Algeria
Moths of Africa